The Lobster Coast is a 2004 book by Colin Woodard that serves as an overview of the history of Maine. The Bangor Daily News called it "thought-provoking" and "provocative", 
while Publishers Weekly compared it to William W. Warner's 1976 Beautiful Swimmers

References

2004 non-fiction books